Justyna Plutowska (born 27 June 1991) is a Polish ice dancer. With former partner Peter Gerber, she is the 2013 Finlandia Trophy bronze medalist and 2014 Bavarian Open champion.

Personal life
Justyna Plutowska was born 27 June 1991 in Gdynia, Poland. Her father is a figure skating coach.

Career

Early years 
Plutowska began figure skating at the age of three or four. After starting out in singles, she turned to ice dancing when she was about 12 or 13. Her first partner was Mateusz Krupowies. The two won the novice ice dancing title at the 2006 Polish Championships.

Partnership with Pietrzyński 
Plutowska teamed up with Dawid Pietrzyński in 2006. The duo won the junior title at the 2009 Polish Championships and were sent to the 2009 World Junior Championships in Sofia, Bulgaria. They ranked 25th in the compulsory dance and 26th in the original dance, which did not allow them to advance to the final segment.

The following season, Plutowska/Pietrzyński repeated as national junior champions and were assigned to the 2010 World Junior Championships in The Hague, Netherlands. Ranked 18th in both the compulsory and original dances, they qualified to the free dance and finished 20th overall. They were coached by Mirosław Plutowski in Gdańsk.

In the 2010–11 season, Plutowska/Pietrzyński moved up to the senior level and took the silver medal at the Polish Championships, behind Alexandra Zvorigina / Maciej Bernadowski. They made no senior international appearances.

Partnership with Gerber 
Plutowska teamed up with Peter Gerber in June 2012. They were coached by Igor Shpilband in Novi, Michigan, and represented GKS Stoczniowiec Gdańsk. Plutowska/Gerber made their debut at the 2012 U.S. International Classic, finishing eighth. They took the silver medal at the 2013 Polish Championships and placed 27th at the 2013 World Championships in London, Ontario, Canada.

In the 2013–14 season, Plutowska/Gerber placed 9th at the U.S. International Classic before competing at the 2013 Nebelhorn Trophy, the final Olympic qualifier. They were 14th in the short dance and 8th in the free dance, finishing 10th overall at Nebelhorn and becoming second alternates for a spot at the 2014 Winter Olympics. Plutowska/Gerber won their first international medal, bronze, at the 2013 Finlandia Trophy one week later. They reached the free dance at the 2014 European Championships in Bratislava and finished 16th overall. After taking gold at the 2014 Bavarian Open in February, the two competed at the 2014 World Championships, held in Saitama, Japan in March, and finished 22nd. Their partnership ended in early May 2014, when Plutowska decided to leave skating for personal reasons.

Partnership with Flemin 
Plutowska teamed up with French ice dancer Jérémie Flemin in May 2016. They decided to represent Poland and debuted their partnership at the 2016 CS Lombardia Trophy, finishing 6th. The two were coached by Barbara Fusar-Poli and Stefano Caruso in Milan, Italy.

Plutowska/Flemin withdrew after the short dance from the 2017 Four Nationals due to a hernia in his back. In 2018 they achieved silver at Polish nationals. 

In June 2018 Plutowska/Flemin moved to Montreal, where they are coached at Gadbois Centre by Romain Haguenauer, Patrice Lauzon and Marie-France Dubreuil.
Together they share their life via the Youtube channel call: J & J ON ICE

Programs

With Flemin

With Gerber

With Pietrzyński

Competitive highlights
CS: Challenger Series; JGP: Junior Grand Prix

With Flemin

With Gerber

With Pietrzyński

With Krupowies

References

External links 
 

 Justyna Plutowska / Dawid Pietrzyński at the Polish Figure Skating Association
 Justyna Plutowska / Mateusz Krupowies at the Polish Figure Skating Association
 Justyna Plutowska / Dawid Pietrzyński at tracings.net
 Justyna Plutowska / Mateusz Krupowies at tracings.net
 Justyna Plutowska at Figure Skating Online

Polish female ice dancers
1991 births
Living people
Sportspeople from Gdynia